Perumal Par, also known as Peremul Par, is an uninhabited coral atoll belonging to the Amindivi Subgroup of islands of the Union Territory of Lakshadweep, India.

Geography

The atoll is very similar in appearance to Cherbaniani Reef further north. It has a large lagoon devoid of islands in the encircling reef, except for 3 small sandy islets located at the eastern area. 
the Islands of Perumal Par are:

Ecology
Terns of different species visit this atoll. Some damage to the corals of this atoll caused by Acanthaster planci crown-of-thorns starfish was observed in the 1990s.

Its surrounding waters are a good fishing area for baitfish and the place is often visited by fishermen from inhabited islands nearby. Tourists from nearby Bangaram Island resort often make excursions to this lonely atoll.

References

External links
Hydrographic Description (Indian Ocean Pilot)
Angling adventures in the Arabian Sea
Birds of Lakshadweep Islands
List of Atolls
An ornithological expedition to the Lakshadweep archipelago
Sources towards a history of the Laccadive Islands

Landforms of Lakshadweep
Atolls of India
Tourism in Lakshadweep
Islands of India
Uninhabited islands of India